Angelo Buizza was a member of the Italian Christian Democracy, and was an Italian Senator from Lombardy. He retired in 1963.

Political career
Buizza won elective office in three consecutive campaigns between 1948 and 1958. He worked in the construction of the Motorway Brescia-Padova.

Role in the Senate

Committee assignments

Electoral history

See also
Italian Senate election in Lombardy, 1948

Footnotes

External links

Site

1885 births
Members of the Italian Senate from Lombardy
Christian Democracy (Italy) politicians
20th-century Italian politicians
Members of the Senate of the Republic (Italy)
Year of death missing